Paisley is an unincorporated community and village in the municipality of Arran–Elderslie, Bruce County in Southwestern Ontario, Canada. Paisley is defined by its position at the confluence of the Saugeen River and the Teeswater River, and at the junction of Bruce Roads 1, 11, and 3.

History
Paisley began with the settlement in 1851 of Simon Orchard and Samuel T. Rowe at the site of what would become the village of Paisley, later that year John Valentine, built a sawmill here. The village was named in 1856 after Paisley, Renfrewshire in Scotland.

Notable persons
Alexander James McPhail, an agricultural reformer, was born in Paisley in 1883.
Marshall Kay, a paleontologist prominently involved with the study of continental drift, was born in Paisley in 1904.
Isabella Valancy Crawford, a prolific Canadian author, lived in Paisley between 1857 and 1861.

Climate

References

External links
Municipality of Arran-Elderslie
www.visitpaisley.ca
www.paisleyvillage.ca
Paisley Business Directory

Former villages in Ontario
Communities in Bruce County